Major Samuel Hill Lawrence VC (22 January 1831 – 17 June 1868), born in Cork, was an Irish recipient of the Victoria Cross, the highest and most prestigious award for gallantry in the face of the enemy that can be awarded to British and Commonwealth forces.

Family
His father, also called Samuel Hill, had a military career in the 32nd Regiment of Foot and was wounded at Quatre Bras, the prelude to Waterloo. The Lawrence family formed part of the 'Protestant Ascendancy' in Ireland. Lawrence Snr. may have been master of the Orange Lodge at Nenagh around the year 1825 and is recorded as living at Belmont Cottage, Douglas, near Cork, Ireland in 1837. His mother, Margaret Macdonald, was of Scots origin. He was the cousin of Lieutenant Thomas Cadell VC.

Details
He was 26 years old, and a lieutenant, with a recent field promotion to captain, in the 32nd Regiment of Foot (later The Duke of Cornwall's Light Infantry), British Army during the Indian Mutiny when the following deeds took place on 7 July 1857 and 26 September 1857 at the Siege of Lucknow for which he was awarded the VC.

He was recommended, by the board of officers which considered the claims of almost all those members of the 32nd Foot for Lucknow-related VCs, for a VC with bar. This suggestion was not taken up in later stages of the process. According to the fourth 'clause' of the original warrant creating the V.C., he would only have been eligible for a bar if he had already been decorated before the second V.C. action.

Further information
He later joined the 25th Regiment of Foot, 8th Hussars and ended his military career, in 1865, with the rank of major in the 11th Hussars.

The United Services Gazette of 15 August 1868 (p8) reported that 'Major Samuel Hill Lawrence V.C., late of the 11th Hussars, died on 17 June at Estancia del Arazati (sic) Monte Video (sic), South America aged 37.' (15)Uruguay 17 June 1868. In fact, Arazatí is in the 'departamento' ('province') of San Jose, not Montevideo. Research at both Montevideo, including the British Cemetery which is often quoted as his burial place, and Arazatí has, so far, failed to reveal his final resting place.

The medal
His Victoria Cross is displayed at the Duke of Cornwall's Light Infantry Museum, Bodmin, Cornwall. Lawrence's campaign medals and miniatures are also on display at the museum. They were donated by a member of the Richards family, into which Lawrence's only surviving sister had married.

References

Listed in order of publication year 
The Register of the Victoria Cross (1981, 1988 and 1997)

Ireland's VCs  (Dept of Economic Development, 1995)
Monuments to Courage (David Harvey, 1999)
Irish Winners of the Victoria Cross (Richard Doherty & David Truesdale, 2000)
 Biography

1831 births
1868 deaths
Military personnel from County Cork
19th-century Anglo-Irish people
Irish officers in the British Army
People from County Cork
32nd Regiment of Foot officers
King's Own Scottish Borderers officers
8th King's Royal Irish Hussars officers
11th Hussars officers
Irish recipients of the Victoria Cross
Indian Rebellion of 1857 recipients of the Victoria Cross
British military personnel of the Second Anglo-Sikh War
British Army recipients of the Victoria Cross
Irish people of Scottish descent